Jean Gaven (16 January 1918 – 5 May 2014) was a French actor. He appeared in more than sixty films between 1945 and 1996.

Life and career
Born in Saint-Rome-de-Cernon, France on January 16, 1922, Gaven began acting sometime after the end of World War II, amassing a filmography of more than 60 motion pictures during a career spanning more than five decades. Married to the actress Dominique Wilms, he died at the age of 92 in Paris, France, on May 5, 2014.

Filmography

References

External links 
 

1922 births
2014 deaths
French male film actors
20th-century French male actors